The 2002–03 season saw Rotherham United compete in the Football League First Division where they finished in 15th position with 45 points.

Final league table

Results
Rotherham United's score comes first

Legend

Football League First Division

FA Cup

Football League Cup

Squad statistics

References

External links
 Rotherham United 2002–03 at Soccerbase.com (select relevant season from dropdown list)

2002–03
Rotherham United